Crescendo Association is a non-profit organisation dedicated to Progressive Rock music. The Crescendo team organise an annual festival in Saint-Palais-sur-Mer (Charente-Maritime, France), which has taken place every third weekend of August since 1999. The idea is to introduce the audience to Progressive Rock music and to please its loyal fans whilst focusing on the quality of the performances rather than on a commercial purpose.

Historical background
Crescendo was created in 1999 by two Progressive Rock music fans from Saint-Palais-sur-Mer : Sebastien Monteaud and Jean-Claude Adelmand. The very first festival welcomed three bands on stage, playing for over five hours in an auditorium in Royan (Charente-Maritime, France). Although the event was very encouraging, Crescendo faced an unsecured future due to financial issues and had to redirect its goal. That's why the current festival is now free and runs over three days in the open air, on the Concié Esplanade in Saint-Palais-sur-Mer, where tourists and fans meet in the month of August. Its increasing success is attracting more and more people every summer, with between 3000 and 5000 visitors in 2010.
The Concié Esplanade turns into a huge stage, welcoming ten Progressive Rock bands with musicians coming from many different countries such as Ukraine, Canada and South America. For example, in 2009, Antony Kalugin and Valentina Chalaydyuck, from Kharkiv (Ukraine) introduced their band "Sunchild" and travelled back the year after just to be part of the 2010 festival.

There are lots of workshops around for visitors, ranging from photography exhibitions, faire trade, etc.

Previous and coming performances 
1999: Höstsonaten (Italy), XII Alfonso (France) et Drama (France)

2000: Mostly Autumn (Great-Britain), Aëntheos (France), Iconoclasta (Mexico)

2001: After Crying (Hungary), Eclat (France), Iconoclasta (Mexico), Janos Varga Project (Hungary), Quidam (Poland)

2002: White Willow (Norway), Taal (France), R.P.W.L. (Germany), Morrigan (France), Vital Duo (France)

2003: Änglagård (Sweden), Focus (Netherlands), Cast (Mexico), Lord of mushrooms (France), Nemo (France), Pineapple Thief (Great-Britain), Taal (France)

2004: Cabezas de Cera (Mexico), Encore Floyd (France), Flamborough Head (Netherlands), High Wheel (Germany), Christian Richet (France), Universal Mind (France)

2005: Underground Jam (Switzerland), Drama (France), Five Fifteen (Finland), Vrooom (France), Trigon (Germany), Pain of Salvation (Sweden)

2006: Maldoror (France), Hamadryad (Canada), Spaced Out (Canada), S.U.E. (France), R.T.D. (France), Mike Manring (U.S.A.), Crazy World (Finland)

2007: Oxygène 8 (Chile/Mexico/U.S.A.), Lazuli (France), Octopus (Chile), Trettioåriga Kriget (Sweden), Motis (France), Karcius (Canada), Phideaux (U.S.A.)

2008: Flor de Loto (Peru), Cast (Mexico), Hypnos 69 (Belgium), The Black Noodle Project (France), Wicked Minds (Italy), Turzi (France), Psicotropia (Spain), Karcius (Canada), Hawkwind (Great-Britain)

2009: Aisles (Chile), Sunchild (Ukraine), Il Bacio Della Medusa (Italy), Simon L'Espérance Band (Canada), Mörglbl (France), Electric Swan (Italy), After (Poland), Baraka (Japan), Djam Karet (U.S.A.)

2010: Hamadryad (Canada), Moongarden (Italy), Gens De La Lune (France), Sylvan Band (Germany), Il Castello Di Atlante (Italy), Special Providence (Hungary), Mavara (Iran), Kotebel (Spain), The Skys (Lithuania), Motis (France)

2011: The Enid (England), Beardfish (Sweden), Jelly Fiche (Canada), Finisterre (Italy), Eclat (France), Panzerballett (Germany), Holding Pattern (U.S.A.), Gungfly (Sweden), The Last Embrace (France), Stick Drum Duo (Mexico-France)

2019: Julián (France), Yan (France), Karcius (Canada), Akiko’s Cosmo Space (Japan), Gala (Switzerland), Trio (Chili), Zio (UK), Ars Nova (Japan), Mörglbl (France), On The Raw (Spain), Electric Swan (Italy), Frank Carducci Band (France).

"Festival In" and "Festival Off" 
Since 2004, the Crescendo Association has been running what is referred to as a "Festival In" and a "Festival Off". The first one takes place just before the great festival in Saint-Palais-sur-Mer, whereas the second one takes place a few days after the great festival. Both of them run around Saint-Palais-sur-Mer, in different local towns. Thanks to the support of the Regional Council, the General Council, the Cultural Commission, the local towns, the Tourist Office and shopkeepers, the popularity of Crescendo and Progressive Rock music in general is increasing massively. The audience is able to discover or rediscover an "unrecognized type of music", closely liked to that of famous bands such as Genesis, Pink Floyd, King Crimson, Mike Oldfield, Ange, Led Zeppelin, Yes, Deep Purple and many others.

CRESCENDO in FRENCH GUYANA 

For the first time, between the 21st and 22 October 2011, CRESCENDO GUYANE FESTIVAL will take place in Montsinéry-Tonnegrande (French Guiana), and will present six bands which are :

Beardfish (Sweden), Karcius (Canada), Cinquillo (Guyana), Gens De La Lune (France), Special Providence (Hungary) and Komanti (Guyana).

References

External links
 

Music organizations based in France
Organizations established in 1999
Non-profit organizations based in France
1999 establishments in France